Gallus Guggumos, probably Guggenmoos or Guggenmoser, (c. 1590c. 1666) was a German composer. He was sent by Albrecht VI of Bavaria (1584–1666) to study with Giovanni Gabrieli in Venice. His Latin motets were recorded by Il Canto Figurato, Ulm in 2008.

References

17th-century German composers
1590s births
1660s deaths
Year of birth uncertain
Year of death uncertain
Expatriates of the Holy Roman Empire in the Republic of Venice